Mircea is a given name. It may also refer to:

Places
 Mircea Vodă (disambiguation), several settlements in Romania
 Izvorul Mircii, a tributary of the Buda in Argeș County, Romania
 Mircea, a tributary of the Ialomița in Dâmbovița County, Romania

Other uses
 Mircea (film), a 1989 Romanian film
 NMS Mircea (1882), the second ship of the Romanian Navy's Black Sea Fleet
 Mircea (ship), built in 1938 as a training vessel for the Romanian Navy